Igor Vasilyevich Piyuk (born 13 May 1982) is a Russian former professional footballer.

Club career
He made his debut in the Russian Premier League in 2001 for FC Torpedo-ZIL Moscow.

Honours
 Russian Premier League runner-up: 2002.
 Russian Cup winner: 2002.

References

1982 births
Footballers from Moscow
Living people
Russian footballers
Russia under-21 international footballers
Association football forwards
FC Moscow players
PFC CSKA Moscow players
FC Chernomorets Novorossiysk players
FC Fakel Voronezh players
FC KAMAZ Naberezhnye Chelny players
FC Oryol players
FC SKA-Khabarovsk players
FC Avangard Kursk players
Russian Premier League players